Rescue on Galatea is a 1982 role-playing game adventure for Traveller published by FASA.

Plot summary
Rescue on Galatea is a mercenary-type adventure situation on an alien world in the Inverness subsector of the Far Frontiers.

Publication history
Rescue on Galatea was written by Mark Lawrence, and was published in 1982 by FASA as a digest-sized 44-page book with a two-color map.

Reception
William A. Barton reviewed Rescue on Galatea in The Space Gamer No. 58. Barton commented that "Rescue on Galatea has much to recommend it and could be a satisfying adventure if the referee doesn't mind tinkering with it more than is usually necessary with FASA fare. And even so, it is still superior to most items coming out of FASA's competitors in the licensed Traveller field."

Bob McWilliams reviewed Rescue on Galatea for White Dwarf #39, giving it an overall rating of 6 out of 10, and stated that "Rescue on Galatea is an interesting one-off adventure; after the usual 'rescue a patron' briefing common to many Traveller epics, complications set in and the whole thing becomes more enjoyable, set on a rather different world."

Reviews
 Different Worlds #23 (Aug, 1982)

References

Role-playing game supplements introduced in 1982
Traveller (role-playing game) adventures